McEwin is the surname of the following people

George McEwin (1815–1885), Australian gardener and orchardist 
George McEwin (lawyer) (1873–1945), Australian lawyer and philanthropist
Jim McEwin (1898–1979), New Zealand cricketer
Lyell McEwin (1897–1988), Australian politician
Ron McEwin (1928–2007), Australian rules footballer

See also
Lyell McEwin Hospital, major hospital for Adelaide, South Australia